Suck may refer to:

Suction, the force exerted by a partial vacuum
.sucks, an Internet top-level domain

Arts and entertainment

Music
 Suck (band), a South African hard rock group
 Suck, drummer for the 1990s Japanese punk band Teengenerate
 Suck, a 2003 album by The Revs
 "Suck", a song by Pigface from Gub
 "Suck", a song by Priests from Nothing Feels Natural
 "Suck", a song by Shriekback from Jam Science
 "Sucks" (song), a song by KMFDM

Other media
 Suck (film), a 2009 vampire musical-comedy
 Suck (publication), a European underground pornographic magazine, 1969–1974
 Suck.com, a satire and editorial web site

Rivers
 River Suck, a river in Ireland
 Suck Run, a stream in Ohio

See also
 Suck Creek (disambiguation)
 Sucker (disambiguation)
 Suk (disambiguation)
 Sux (disambiguation)
 Mediocrity (disambiguation)